Gwen Grant is an English writer primarily known for her works for children and young adults and is the author of seventeen published novels and picture books. Many of her short stories and poems have been anthologised in collections by leading publishers, including Oxford University Press and Macmillan. Her initial novel, Private – Keep Out, was shortlisted for both the Carnegie Medal and The Other Award, and she has since been the recipient of a number of additional awards and shortlisted for others. She was also the subject of a documentary by Thames TV and her works have been featured on BBC and ITV segments.

In addition to her contributions as a writer, Gwen Grant has also done important outreach work in schools, stimulating interest in reading and creative writing in children by leading individually crafted classes and seminars. She also coaches aspiring new writers, serving as a respected guide and editor of their beginning efforts.

Biography

Gwendoline Ellen Rewston was born in Worksop, Nottinghamshire in 1940, in the early days of World War II. At the time, the town's economy was based almost entirely on the fortunes and misfortunes of the coal mining industry. Gwen, the fourth of six children, was the daughter of George Rewston, a general labourer and miner, and his wife, Alice (née Hall), a homemaker. Her early life and experiences were strongly impacted by the poverty of a miner's family and what she heard and observed of the dangerous working conditions of the "pit", as the mines were commonly known, and by the deprivations and strains of the war. Despite that, her parents taught her that there was opportunity for everyone. For an anthology of women's writing published in the United States, she wrote, 

Gwendoline Rewston married Ian Grant and is known personally and professionally as Gwen Grant. She became the mother of twin sons, and is now a grandmother and great-grandmother.

In 1975, she earned a Bachelor of Arts in Humanities from The Open University and in the same year, began her writing career. Her first picture book, Matthew and His Magic Kite, was published in 1977. In 1978, she published Private – Keep Out and followed up with Knock and Wait. Her output since has been prodigious and she continues her work today. In 2010, she contributed a story to Stories for Haiti, an anthology published as a charitable project to help bring relief to the victims of the destructive earthquake there.

Publications

Novels
Private – Keep Out ("The funniest children's book ever written" Lucy Mangan, The Guardian. Shortlisted: Carnegie Medal and The Other Award)
Knock And Wait
One Way Only
Enemies Are Dangerous
Lily Pickle Band Book (Translated. Shortlisted: Guardian Children's Fiction Award)
Lily Pickle Eleven
Bonny Starr and the Riddles of Time
Walloping Stick War (short novel)
Crash (short novel)
The Revolutionary's Daughter (Nominated: Carnegie Medal, Shortlisted: Lancs Children's Book Award)
Gypsy Racer
Fox Fire (short novel)
The Last Chance (Shortlisted: Lancs Children's Book Award)

Television and Radio
Thames TV Documentary
East Midlands Arts Writers Video Series
Private – Keep Out featured on Black and White and Read All Over (BBC)
Private – Keep Out featured on Woman's Hour – (BBC)
Knock and Wait featured on ITV's Book Tower

Picture books
Matthew and His Magic Kite (Translated.)
Little Blue Car (Translated. Included Best British Books 1992; Also animated cartoon – BBC CBeebies)
Jonpanda (Won: Notts Libraries Acorn Award 1993)
Race Day (Translated)

Anthologies – Stories and Poems
Mothers and Daughters (Mammoth)
Mixed Feelings
Sinister Stories (Methuen. Translated.)
Our Book of Christmas Stories (Oxford University Press)
Orchard Children's Treasury (Orchard Books)
All Year Round (Evans)
Scholastic Assemblies (Scholastic Books)
Woman's Realm (Translated.)
Poem in "Woman and Home"
Short stories on BBC Radio
Mother Daughter Bonds (Poetry Now)
Lines in the Sand (Frances Lincoln; in aid of UNICEF)
In the Frame (Five Leaves Press)
WOW! (Scholastic Children's Books; in aid of NSPCC Childline)
100 Stories for Haiti (Bridge House Press; in aid of Haiti earthquake refugees)
Monster Poems (MacmIllan)
Folio (Literary magazine)
Leaves (Southwell Minster magazine)
Poems in many poetry magazines.

References

External links 
 Gwen Grant's official website

1940 births
Alumni of the Open University
English writers
Living people
People from Worksop